The UDR Four were four members of the 2nd Battalion, Ulster Defence Regiment who were convicted of the murder of Adrian Carroll in 1983.  Adrian Carroll was the brother of the Sinn Féin councillor Tommy Carroll.

Three of the Ulster Defence Regiment soldiers were acquitted on appeal in 1992.  However a fourth, Neil Latimer, had his conviction upheld and served 14 years in prison before being released under the Good Friday Agreement.

Latimer unsuccessfully appealed against his conviction on occasions.  Three appeals against the same conviction were unprecedented in British legal history.

Early Day Motion (House of Commons)

On 21 October 1992 Peter Robinson moved an Early Day Motion in the House of Commons of the United Kingdom that said:
That this House urges the Secretary of State for Northern Ireland to consider a further referral to the Court of Appeal of the case of Neil Latimer; acknowledges that the recent judgement in the UDR 4 case relied heavily upon the evidence of witness A in refusing Neil Latimer's release; is now deeply concerned about the safety of that judgement in light of an affidavit signed by a Roman Catholic priest, Pat Buckley, alleging he met the women known as witness A who informed him she was not certain that Neil Latimer was the man she saw in Lonsdale Street in November 1983 and that she believed Neil Latimer is an innocent man; and seeks an investigation into claims, in the same affidavit, that witness A, her family and friends have received favours from the police in exchange for witness A not retracting her statement.

References

Ulster Defence Regiment
Conflicts in 1983
1983 in Northern Ireland
The Troubles in County Armagh
Military scandals
Terrorism in Northern Ireland
Soldiers imprisoned during the Northern Ireland conflict
1986 in Northern Ireland